Burnupena is a genus of sea snails, marine gastropod mollusks in the superfamily Buccinoidea.

Species
Species within the genus Burnupena include:

 Burnupena catarrhacta (Gmelin, 1791) 
 Burnupena cincta (Röding, 1798) 
 Burnupena denseliriata Dempster & Branch, 1999
 Burnupena lagenaria (Lamarck, 1822) 
 Burnupena papyracea (Bruguière, 1789) 
 Burnupena pubescens (Küster, 1858) 
 Burnupena rotunda Dempster & Branch, 1999
Species brought into synonymy
 Burnupena delalandii (Kiener, 1834): synonym of Burnupena catarrhacta (Gmelin, 1791)
 Burnupena dunkeri]' (Küster, 1858): synonym of Burnupena catarrhacta (Gmelin, 1791)
 Burnupena limbosa (Lamarck, 1822): synonym of Burnupena cincta limbosa (Lamarck, 1822)
 Burnupena tigrina (Kiener, 1834): synonym of Burnupena pubescens'' (Küster, 1858)

References

External links
 Iredale, T. (1918). Molluscan nomenclatural problems and solutions.- No. 1. Proceedings of the Malacological Society of London. 13(1-2): 28-40

Buccinoidea (unassigned)
Gastropod genera